Chene Lawson (born February 28, 1971) is an American actress. She is best known for the role of Yolanda Hamilton, the derelict mother of Devon Hamilton (Bryton James) on The Young and the Restless.

Filmography
 Film

 Television

References

External links
 

Living people
Place of birth missing (living people)
African-American actresses
American television actresses
American soap opera actresses
Actresses from Chicago
1971 births
21st-century African-American people
21st-century African-American women
20th-century African-American people
20th-century African-American women